Derenkovets is a village in Cherkasy Raion, Cherkasy Oblast, central Ukraine. It has a population of 1,778 residents.

Geography
Derenkovets is situated on the bank of the Ros river, a right tributary of the Dnieper. The village experiences a humid continental climate.

Demographics
The 1989 census of the Ukrainian Soviet Socialist Republic reported a population of 2,219 in the village. By the Ukrainian census of 2001, the population fell to 1,778.

Language
According to the 2001 census, 98.03% of residents spoke Ukrainian as their first language, 1.69% spoke Russian, 0.22% spoke Moldovan, and 0.06% spoke Belarusian.

References

Villages in Cherkasy Raion